Andrzej Konopek (30 November 1920 – 27 November 2007) is a former Polish footballer who played as a midfielder. Konopek's career spanned over 20 years and was split between 3 teams.

Biography

Born in Kraków, Konopek started his career with his local team Zwierzyniecki Kraków. While his career was spent playing in the lower divisions of Polish football, Konopek was involved in a footnote of Polish footballing history. As the war was coming to an end the reintroduction of football in Poland was discussed. On January 28, 1945, 10 days after the liberation of Kraków, four teams in the city came together to play their first games since the outbreak of the war in 1939. The four teams were Cracovia, Juvenia, Wisła, and Zwierzyniecki. The first game of the day was Juvenia vs Zwierzyniecki, and was the first football game in Poland since the outbreak. Konopek was involved in the game, which finished 2–2, with Konopek scoring both of Zwierzyniecki goals. Meaning that not only was Konopek involved in the first football game since 1939, but he may have also been the first goal scorer.

Konopek remained with Zwierzyniecki until 1947, when he moved to Hutnik Nowa Huta. After being with Hutnik for 2 years, he moved to newly promoted I liga side Lechia Gdańsk. Konopek made his top division debut on September 15, 1949, against ŁKS Łódź. He went on to make 6 appearances for Lechia that season, but with the club being relegated Konopek returned to Hutnik Nowa Huta. After spending a few more years with Hutnik, Konopek returned to the North of Poland and rejoined Lechia. He spent 3 years with Lechia but failed to make any further appearances for the club. In 1955 he returned to the club where he started his career, spending the final 5 years of his career with Zwierzyniecki Kraków before retiring in 1960.

References

1920 births
2007 deaths
Hutnik Nowa Huta players
Lechia Gdańsk players
Polish footballers
Association football midfielders